Aeroport District  (rayon Aeroport, "Airport District") is an administrative district (raion) of the Northern Administrative Okrug and one of the 125 raions of Moscow, Russia.

The district is named for the Khodynka Aerodrome, which closed in 2003. The Aeroport Metro Station opened in the district in 1938.

Economy
The aviation companies Irkut, Ilyushin,  and Yakovlev have their head offices in the district.

Education
The New Humanitarian School, a private school, is in the district.

See also

Administrative divisions of Moscow
Khodynka Aerodrome
Aeroport (Moscow Metro)

References

Notes

Sources

Districts of Moscow
Northern Administrative Okrug